Euphorbia tanaensis is a species of plant in the family Euphorbiaceae. It is endemic to Kenya.

References

tanaensis
Endemic flora of Kenya
Critically endangered flora of Africa
Taxonomy articles created by Polbot